The Hereford by-election of 14 February 1956 was held after the resignation of Conservative Member of Parliament (MP) Jim Thomas.

The seat was safe, having been won by Thomas at the 1955 United Kingdom general election albeit with a reduced majority of over 2,000 votes. The Liberals, who had already polled nearly one-quarter of the vote in 1955, increased their share to 36.4%.

Candidates
David Gibson-Watt was the Conservative candidate to hold the seat. He had served in the Welsh Guards and was a former local councillor. 
Frank Owen A local man who had served in his youth as the Liberal MP for Hereford between 1929 and 1931. At the 1955 general election, he had contested the seat for the first time since losing it in 1931, and polled a good second place.
Labour candidate Bryan Stanley was, at the time, a technical engineer and member of the Labour National Executive Committee.

Result of the previous general election

Result of the by-election

References

1956 in England
By-election, 1956
February 1956 events in the United Kingdom
By-elections to the Parliament of the United Kingdom in Herefordshire constituencies
1956 elections in the United Kingdom
20th century in Herefordshire